Panthera tigris soloensis, known as the Ngandong tiger, is an extinct subspecies of the modern tiger species. It inhabited the Sundaland region of Indonesia during the Pleistocene epoch.

Discoveries 
Fossils of the Ngandong tiger were excavated primarily near the village of Ngandong, hence the common name. Only seven fossils are known, making study of the animal difficult.

Description 
The few remains of the Ngandong tiger suggest that it would have been about the size of a modern Bengal tiger. However, given the size of other remains, it may have been larger than a modern tiger.

Paleoecology 
In addition to the remains of the Ngandong tiger, many other fossils from the same era have been discovered in Ngandong, like the proboscideans Stegodon trigonocephalus and Elephas hysudrindicus, the bovines Bubalus palaeokerabau and Bos palaesondaicus, the extant perissodactyls Tapirus indicus and Rhinoceros sondaicus, and a great variety of cervine species. Homo erectus soloensis fossils are also known from the area.

See also 
 Bornean tiger
 Prehistoric tigers: Panthera tigris trinilensis  Panthera tigris acutidens
 Panthera zdanskyi

References

External links 
 A new specimen-dependent method of estimating felid body mass (not peer-reviewed)

tigris soloensis
tigris soloensis
Extinct animals of Indonesia
Pleistocene carnivorans
Fossil taxa described in 1933